Malaya Purga (Pići Purga) is a rural locality (a selo) and the administrative center of Malopurginsky District in the Udmurt Republic, Russia. Population:

References

Rural localities in Udmurtia